Argyra is a genus of flies in the family Dolichopodidae. The name "Argyra" comes from the Greek word for "silver".

Species

Argyra albicans Loew, 1861
Argyra albicoxa Van Duzee, 1925
Argyra albiventris Loew, 1864
Argyra aldrichi Johnson, 1904
Argyra amicta (Wiedemann, 1824)
Argyra angustata Van Duzee, 1925
Argyra apicalis Van Duzee, 1930
Argyra argentina (Meigen, 1824)
Argyra argentiventris Van Duzee, 1925
Argyra argyria (Meigen, 1824)
Argyra aripontia Negrobov, 2005
Argyra arrogans Takagi, 1960
Argyra atriceps Loew, 1857
Argyra auricollis (Meigen, 1824)
Argyra badjaginae Negrobov & Maslova, 2003
Argyra barbipes Van Duzee, 1925
Argyra basalis Van Duzee, 1932
Argyra beijingensis Wang & Yang, 2004
Argyra bickeliana Negrobov, Barkalov & Selivanova, 2010
Argyra bimaculata Van Duzee, 1925
Argyra biseta Parent, 1929
Argyra brevipes Van Duzee, 1925
Argyra calceata Loew, 1861
Argyra calcitrans Loew, 1861
Argyra californica Van Duzee, 1925
Argyra canariensis Becker, 1918
Argyra ciliata Van Duzee, 1924
Argyra cingulata (Loew, 1861)
Argyra condomina Harmston & Knowlton, 1946
Argyra corsica Parent, 1929
Argyra currani Van Duzee, 1925
Argyra cylindrica Loew, 1864
Argyra dakotensis Harmston & Knowlton, 1939
Argyra diaphana (Fabricius, 1775)
Argyra discedens Becker, 1907
Argyra elongata (Zetterstedt, 1843)
Argyra fasciventris Van Duzee, 1930
Argyra femoralis Van Duzee, 1925
Argyra flabellifera Becker, 1891
Argyra flavicornis Van Duzee, 1925
Argyra flavicoxa Van Duzee, 1925
Argyra flavida Negrobov, 1973
Argyra flavipes Van Duzee, 1925
Argyra gorodkovi Negrobov & Selivanova, 2008
Argyra grata Loew, 1857
Argyra grayi Robinson, 1964
Argyra hirta Van Duzee, 1925
Argyra hoffmeisteri (Loew, 1850)
Argyra hokkaidoensis Negrobov & Sato, 2009
Argyra idahona Harmston & Knowlton, 1946
Argyra igori Sato & Selivanova, 2012
Argyra ilonae Gosseries, 1989
Argyra inaequalis Van Duzee, 1925
Argyra involuta Van Duzee, 1925
Argyra javanensis Van Duzee, 1931
Argyra johnsoni Van Duzee, 1925
Argyra kireichuki Grichanov, 1998
Argyra leucocephala (Meigen, 1824)
Argyra loewii Kowarz, 1879
Argyra longicornis Qilemoge, Wang, & Yang, 2018
Argyra magnicornis (Zetterstedt, 1838)
Argyra medusae Gosseries, 1989
Argyra miki (Kowarz, 1882)
Argyra minuta Loew, 1861
Argyra negrobovi Grichanov & Shamshev, 1993
Argyra nigricoxa Van Duzee, 1925
Argyra nigripes Loew, 1864
Argyra nigripilosa Yang & Saigusa, 2002
Argyra nigriventris Van Duzee, 1925
Argyra obscura Van Duzee, 1925
Argyra oreada Negrobov, 1973
Argyra pallipilosa Yang & Saigusa, 2002
Argyra perplexa Becker, 1918
Argyra pingwuensis Qilemoge, Wang, & Yang, 2018
Argyra pseudosuperba Hollis, 1964
Argyra pulata Negrobov & Maslova, 2003
Argyra robinsoni Grichanov, 1998
Argyra robusta Johnson, 1906
Argyra scutellaris Van Duzee, 1925
Argyra sericata Van Duzee, 1925
Argyra serrata Yang & Saigusa, 2002
Argyra setimana Loew, 1859
Argyra setipes Van Duzee, 1925
Argyra setulipes Becker, 1918
Argyra shamshevi Selivanova & Negrobov, 2006
Argyra sichuanensis Qilemoge, Wang, & Yang, 2018
Argyra similis Harmston & Knowlton, 1940
Argyra sinensis Yang & Grootaert, 1999
Argyra skufjini Negrobov, 1965
Argyra spina Van Duzee, 1925
Argyra splendens Van Duzee, 1933
Argyra splendida De Meijere, 1919
Argyra spoliata Kowarz, 1879
Argyra striaticollis Becker, 1918
Argyra subarctica Ringdahl, 1920
Argyra submontana Negrobov & Selivanova, 2006
Argyra succinorum (Meunier, 1907)
Argyra superba Takagi, 1960
Argyra sviridovae Selivanova & Negrobov, 2006
Argyra takagii Negrobov & Sato, 2009
Argyra thoracica Van Duzee, 1925
Argyra tibetensis Wang, Chen & Yang, 2015
Argyra ussuriana Negrobov, 1973
Argyra utahna Harmston, 1951
Argyra vanoyei (Parent, 1926)
Argyra velutina Van Duzee, 1925
Argyra venevitinovensis Selivanova & Negrobov, 2007
Argyra vestita (Wiedemann, 1817)
Argyra xanthopyga Negrobov & Grichanov, 2006
Argyra xiaolongmensis Wang & Yang in Yang, Zhang, Wang & Zhu, 2011
Argyra zlobini Sato & Selivanova, 2012

The following extinct species were originally placed in Argyra, but are currently considered unplaced in Dolichopodidae:
 †Argyra debellata Meunier, 1907
 †Argyra debilis Meunier, 1907
 †Argyra deceptoria Meunier, 1907

Other unrecognised species:
 Argyra diaphana (Fabricius, 1805) (junior homonym of Argyra diaphana (Fabricius, 1775))
 Argyra festivus Meigen, 1838
 Argyra spinipes (Meigen, 1830)
 Argyra spinipes Doleschall, 1856 (homonym of above)

The following species were renamed:
 Argyra splendida Van Duzee, 1925 (preoccupied by Argyra splendida De Meijere, 1919): renamed to Argyra splendens Van Duzee, 1933
 Dolichopus abdominalis Say, 1829 (preoccupied by Dolichopus abdominalis Fallén, 1823): renamed to Argyra medusae Gosseries, 1989
 Dolichopus confinis Zetterstedt, 1843 (preoccupied by Dolichopus confinis Walker, 1849): renamed to Argyra ilonae Gosseries, 1989

References 

Dolichopodidae genera
Diaphorinae
Taxa named by Pierre-Justin-Marie Macquart